Moscow Open may refer to:

Aeroflot Open, chess tournament held in Moscow
Hoff Open, men's tennis tournament held in Moscow
Moscow Ladies Open, former women's tennis tournament
Moscow Open (athletics), track and field meeting formerly part of the European Athletic Association tour
Moscow Open (chess), chess tournament held in Moscow
Moscow River Cup, women's tennis tournament 
Russian Open, former golf tournament held in Moscow